The Luftwaffe's rescue buoy (Rettungsboje) was designed to provide shelter for the pilots or crew of aircraft shot down or forced to make an emergency landing over water.

History
The buoys were developed for flyers of the Luftwaffe brought down while operating over the English Channel, and were constructed under the direction of the German Ministry of Air Navigation in 1940 at the suggestion of Generaloberst Ernst Udet, Director-General of Equipment for the Luftwaffe. Because of this, an alternate name for them was the Udet-Boje.

A flag pole allowed a flag or lamp to be hoisted, supplies included a basic medical kit, iron rations, water, life jackets and ropes.

An improved buoy was designed and 50 were anchored in the English Channel during 1940.

Design of improved buoy

Rescue
Being in fixed locations, they could be checked once or twice a day: if occupied, a seaplane or Flugsicherungboot (high speed launch) could be summoned.

They saved many airmen that ships or seaplanes might have been too late to rescue.

British equivalent

A British equivalent, the Air-Sea Rescue Float was also developed and deployed.  They used a boat-shaped hull of welded steel. Sixteen were constructed, and they were deployed under the main routes bombers took to and from continental Europe. They were equipped with cooking facilities, signal flags, a radio and six bunks. Food, blankets, clothing, drinking water and first-aid supplies were carried.

One example - ASR-10 is in the collection of the Scottish Maritime Museum. During the war, it was deployed in the English Channel at Dover. In the 1950s it was converted into a yacht but it has since been restored to its original configuration.

Defence usage
A rescue buoy was incorporated into the harbour boom at Braye Harbour in German-occupied Alderney, reputedly manned by three men armed with a machine gun.

In film
Rettungsbojen have appeared in films from the World War II period: One of Our Aircraft Is Missing (1942) and We Dive at Dawn (1943).

References

Luftwaffe
Air force history
Aviation history of Germany
Buoyage